Katsina Airport  is an airport serving Katsina, the capital of Katsina State in Nigeria. The runway is on the northeast side of the city.

Airlines and destinations

See also
Transport in Nigeria
List of airports in Nigeria

References

External links
OurAirports - Katsina

Airports in Nigeria
Katsina